In algebraic K-theory, a branch of mathematics, Bloch's formula, introduced by Spencer Bloch for , states that the Chow group of a smooth variety X over a field is isomorphic to the cohomology of X with coefficients in the K-theory of the structure sheaf ; that is,

where the right-hand side is the sheaf cohomology;  is the sheaf associated to the presheaf , U Zariski open subsets of X. The general case is due to Quillen. For q = 1, one recovers . (see also Picard group.)

The formula for the mixed characteristic is still open.

References 

Daniel Quillen: Higher algebraic K-theory: I. In: H. Bass (ed.): Higher K-Theories. Lecture Notes in Mathematics, vol. 341. Springer-Verlag, Berlin 1973. 

Algebraic K-theory
Algebraic geometry
Theorems in algebraic topology